The Roman Catholic Diocese of Facatativá is a diocese located in the northwest of Cundinamarca Department in Colombia. Its see is the city of Facatativá; the diocese is part of the ecclesiastical province of Bogotá in Colombia.

The diocesan territory includes the municipalities of Albán, Bojacá, El Rosal, Facatativá, Funza, Guayabal de Síquima, La Vega, Madrid, Mosquera, Nimaima, Nocaima, Quebradanegra, San Francisco de Sales, Sasaima, Subachoque, Supatá, Tabio, Tenjo, Tobía, Útica, Vergara, Villeta and Zipacón in Cundinamarca.

The diocese is bordered by the Diocese of Zipaquirá to the north, the Dioceses of Engativá and Fontibón to the east, the Diocese of Girardot to the southwest, and the Diocese of La Dorada-Guaduas to the northwest.

History
The Diocese of Facatativá was erected on 16 March 1962 from territory of the Archdiocese of Bogotá and the Diocese of Zipaquirá. Raúl Zambrano Camader was appointed the first bishop of the diocese.

In 1971, the Bishops of Zipaquirá and Facatativá agreed to transfer the parishes of La Peña, Topaipí and San Antonio de Aguilera (a rural parish of Topaipí) back to the Diocese of Zipaquirá. On 29 March 1984, the Diocese of La Dorada-Guaduas was erected, including territory ceded from the Diocese of Facatativá and two others.

Seminary 
Seminarians from the Diocese of Facatativá attend the Major Seminary of Bogotá.

Bishops

Ordinaries
Raul Zambrano Camader (26 April 1962 – 18 December 1972)
Hernando Velásquez Lotero (27 April 1973 – 18 May 1985)
Luis Gabriel Romero Franco (15 April 1986 – 13 November 2010)
Luis Antonio Nova Rocha (22 January 2011 – 9 April 2013)
José Miguel Gómez Rodríguez (23 Feb 2015 – 25 April 2021)

Other priest of this diocese who became bishop
Jaime Prieto Amaya, appointed Bishop of Barrancabermeja in 1993

See also
Roman Catholicism in Colombia

Sources

Roman Catholic dioceses in Colombia
Roman Catholic Ecclesiastical Province of Bogotá
Christian organizations established in 1962
Roman Catholic dioceses and prelatures established in the 20th century